Silvio Carlos de Oliveira (born 1 February 1985), commonly known as Silvio, is a Brazilian professional footballer who plays as a forward for Swiss Challenge League side FC Wil.

Life and career
Silvio was born in Mandaguari, Paraná.

He joined Swiss club FC Wil in February 2006, from Santos. He was signed by FC Zürich from FC Wil in February 2008. Silvio signed for 2. Bundesliga side 1. FC Union Berlin on 6 July 2011, on a three-year deal.

On 27 January 2014, he moved to the Austrian Bundesliga side Wolfsberger AC, signing a -year deal.

References

External links
 Career history at ASF 
 

1985 births
Living people
Association football forwards
Brazilian footballers
Brazilian expatriate footballers
Sportspeople from Paraná (state)
Santos FC players
FC Zürich players
FC Wil players
1. FC Union Berlin players
Wolfsberger AC players
FC Winterthur players
Swiss Super League players
Swiss Challenge League players
2. Bundesliga players
Austrian Football Bundesliga players
Expatriate footballers in Switzerland
Expatriate footballers in Germany
Expatriate footballers in Austria
Brazilian expatriate sportspeople in Germany
Brazilian expatriate sportspeople in Switzerland
Brazilian expatriate sportspeople in Austria